Sir Ka-shing Li  (born 13 June 1928) is a Hong Kong billionaire business magnate, investor, and philanthropist. As of June 2019, Li is the 31st richest person in the world, with an estimated net wealth of US$33.4 billion. He is the senior advisor for CK Hutchison Holdings and CK Asset Holdings, after he retired from the Chairman of the Board in May 2018; through it, he is the world's leading port investor, developer, and operator of the largest health and beauty retailer in Asia and Europe. Forbes magazine released its Hong Kong fortune league chart in February 2021, which showed that Li Ka-shing had reclaimed his prime position as Hong Kong's richest person, with his net assets topping US$35.40 billion.

Li is one of the most influential entrepreneurs in Asia, presiding over a business empire with a diverse portfolio of businesses from a wide array of industries, including transportation, real estate, financial services, retail, and energy and utilities. His conglomerate company Cheung Kong Holdings is influential in many sectors of the Hong Kong economy and made up 4% of the aggregate market capitalisation of the Hong Kong Stock Exchange. Forbes Magazine and the Forbes family honoured Li Ka-shing with the first ever Malcolm S. Forbes Lifetime Achievement Award on 5 September 2006, in Singapore. In spite of his wealth, Li has cultivated a reputation for leading a frugal no-frills lifestyle, and is known to wear simple black dress shoes and an inexpensive Seiko wristwatch. He lived in the same house for decades, in what has now become one of the most expensive districts in Hong Kong, Deep Water Bay in Hong Kong Island. Li is also regarded as one of Asia's most generous philanthropists, donating billions of dollars to charity and other various philanthropic causes, and owning the second largest private foundation in the world after Bill & Melinda Gates Foundation. In 2019 Forbes put Li in the list of the world's most generous philanthropists outside of the US. Li is often referred to as "Superman Li" in Hong Kong because of his business prowess.

Early life 
Li was born in Chao'an, Chaozhou in Guangdong Province in 1928 to Teochew parents named Li Yun-ching (1898–1943) and Cheung Bik-chin (1893–1984). Li and his family fled to Hong Kong in 1940 as refugees from the Sino-Japanese war. Owing to his father's death from tuberculosis, he was forced to leave school at the age of 15 and found a job in a plastics trading company where he worked 16 hours a day. In 1950 he started his own company, Cheung Kong Industries. From manufacturing plastics, Li developed his company into a leading real estate investment company in Hong Kong that was listed on the Hong Kong Stock Exchange in 1972. Cheung Kong expanded by acquiring Hutchison Whampoa and Hongkong Electric Holdings Limited in 1979 and 1985 respectively.

Business career

Plastics manufacturing
In 1950, after learning how to operate a plant, Li founded a plastic manufacturing company in Hong Kong with personal savings and funds borrowed from relatives. Li avidly read trade publications and business news before deciding to supply the world with high quality plastic flowers at low prices. Li learned the technique of mixing colour with plastics that resemble real flowers. After retooling his shop, he prepared the plant for a visit from a large foreign buyer. Fortunately for Li, the buyer placed a large order and a few years later, Li grew to be the largest supplier of plastic flowers in Asia and made a fortune selling them.

Real estate
In 1958, believing rents would continue to rise, Li decided to purchase a site and develop his own factory building. An opportunity to acquire more land arrived after the 1967 riots when many people fled Hong Kong, and, as a result, property prices plummeted. Li believed the political crisis would be temporary and property prices would eventually rise, and bought land from the fleeing residents at low prices. In 1971, Li officially named his real estate development company Cheung Kong. Cheung Kong Holdings was publicly listed in Hong Kong Stock Exchange in 1972. During board meetings, Li stated on a number of occasions his goal of surpassing the Jardines-owned Hongkong Land as a leading developer.

The successful bid by Cheung Kong for development sites above the Central and Admiralty MTR stations in 1977 was the key to challenging Hongkong Land as the premier property developer in Hong Kong. Despite its size, Jardines decided in the 1980s to protect itself from hostile takeover by Li or other outside investors. The company implemented a cross-shareholding structure that was designed to place control in the hands of Britain's Keswick family despite their less than 10% holdings in the group. In 1984, the company also moved its legal domicile from Hong Kong to another British overseas territory – Bermuda, in anticipation of the transfer of sovereignty of Hong Kong to People's Republic of China in 1997.

In an effort to drive forward divestitures of assets in Hong Kong and the Chinese Mainland, Li agreed to sell The Center, the fifth-tallest skyscraper in Hong Kong. With a value of HK$40.2 billion (US$5.15 billion), the deal constitutes the biggest ever office space real estate sale in the Asia-Pacific region. Li sold the Century Link complex in Shanghai for US$2.95 billion, the second largest transaction for a single building, according to the Financial Times.

In 1979, Li purchased a major stake in Hutchison Whampoa Company Limited from Hong Kong Bank through Cheung Kong.

Retail
A subsidiary of CK Hutchison, the A.S. Watson Group (ASW), is a retail operator with over 15,000 stores. Its portfolio encompasses retail brands in Europe such as Superdrug (UK), Marionnaud (France), Kruidvat (Benelux countries), and in Asia including health and beauty retailer Watson's store and wine cellars et al., PARKnSHOP supermarkets (and spin-off brands), and Fortress electrical appliance stores. ASW also produces and distributes water products and beverages in the region.

Asset trading
CK Hutchison group has the reputation of being an astute asset trader. It builds up new businesses and sells them off when shareholder value could be created. Huge profits were obtained in the sale of its interest in Orange to Mannesmann Group in 1999, making a profit of $15.12 billion. In 2006 Li sold 20% of Hutchison's ports business to Singapore rival PSA Corp., making a $3.12 billion profit on a $4 billion deal.

Group subsidiary Hutchison Telecommunications sold a controlling stake of 67% in Hutchison Essar, a joint venture Mobile operator in India, to Vodafone for $11.1 billion.

Internet and technology
Li has also made a foray into the technology business, where his investment and venture capital firm Horizons Ventures is specifically allocated towards backing new internet and technology startup firms, and bought a stake in doubleTwist. His other firm, the Li Ka Shing Foundation bought a 0.8% stake in social networking website :Facebook for $120 million in two separate rounds, and invested an estimated $50 million in the music streaming service Spotify. Some time between late 2009 and early 2010, Li Ka-shing led a $15.5 million Series B round of financing for Siri Inc.

In 2011, Horizons Ventures invested in Summly, a website-summarizing app. Notably, the investment made Nick D'Aloisio, Summly's founder, the world's youngest person to receive a venture capital investment at just fifteen years old. In 2012, Horizons Ventures invested $2.3 million in Wibbitz, a company that provides a text-to-video technology that can automatically convert any article post or feed on the web into a video in a matter of seconds.  In August 2012, Li acquired a stake in Ginger Software Incorporated. In 2013, Horizons Ventures invested in Bitcoin payment company BitPay.

In February 2015, Horizons Ventures participated in a $30 million Series C funding round in Zoom Video Communications. Later in the year, Li participated in a $108 million Series D round in Impossible Foods. In 2016, he continued investments in technology companies and Horizons Ventures led a $55 million Series A round in Blockstream, the leader in blockchain related technologies, and also invested in a startup incubator fund Expa, that works with the founders to build new companies.

In September 2017, Li worked with Alibaba's Jack Ma to bring AlipayHK, a digital wallet service to Hong Kong.

Australian tax dispute
In 2013 a claim was lodged by the Australian Tax Office (ATO) against Cheung Kong Infrastructure (CKI) to pay approximately A$370 million in unpaid tax, penalties and interest relating to tax disputes concerning SA Power Networks and Victoria Power Networks. The dispute was resolved in 2015 when CKI entered into an agreement with the ATO.  No penalty was levied against CKI and a sum of approximately A$24 million was refunded from the A$64 million previously paid to the ATO by CKI.

Retirement 
After his almost-70-year-long reign over CK Hutchison Holdings and CK Asset Holdings, Li announced his retirement on 16 March 2018 and the decision to pass his $100billion empire on to his son, Victor Li. He is still involved in the conglomerate as a senior advisor.

Others
Besides business through his flagship companies CK Asset Holdings and CK Hutchison Holdings Limited, Li Ka-shing has also personally invested extensively in real estate in Singapore and Canada. He was the single largest shareholder of Canadian Imperial Bank of Commerce (CIBC), the fifth largest bank in Canada, until the sale of his share in 2005 (with all proceedings donated, see below). He is also the majority shareholder of a major energy company, Husky Energy, based in Alberta, Canada. Husky was acquired by Cenovus in 2021, and Li owns 27.2% of the newly merged company. 

In January 2005, Li announced plans to sell his $1.2 billion CAD stake in the Canadian Imperial Bank of Commerce, with all proceeds going to private charitable foundations established by Li, including the Li Ka Shing Foundation in Hong Kong and the Li Ka Shing (Canada) Foundation based in Toronto, Ontario. Li was the non-executive director of The Hongkong and Shanghai Banking Corporation since 1980 and became Deputy Chairman of the bank in 1985. He was also Deputy Chairman of HSBC Holdings in 1991–1992.

According to Bloomberg, he had a net worth of US$35.3 Billion in July 2021.

Personal life 
His two sons, Victor Li and Richard Li, are also prominent figures in the Hong Kong business scene. Victor Li succeeded his father as Chairman of CK Hutchison Holdings and Chairman of CK Asset Holdings Limited, while Richard Li is Chairman of PCCW, the largest telecom company in Hong Kong. They are both Canadian citizens. He is a follower of Buddhism.

Married to his first cousin, Chong Yuet-ming (1933–1990), they had a long period of marriage that lasted for 27–28 years from 1962 until her sudden death on New Year's Day 1990 due to a suspected drug overdose (other sources rumoured it as cardiac arrest). She was the daughter of his maternal uncle (mother's younger brother), Cheung Jing-on (1908–1996) and his wife, Hew Bik-yin (1911–2002), who were also from the Chaoshan region, but were both settled in British Hong Kong long before he migrated to the city, as she was born and bred there to emigrant Teochew parents from that region in Guangdong.

Li is famously plainly dressed for a Hong Kong tycoon. In the 1990s he wore a $50 HKD timepiece from Citizen Watch Co. and plain ties. He later wore a Seiko. In 2016, he wore a $500 HKD Citizen watch.

His son Victor Li was kidnapped in 1996 on his way home after work by gangster Cheung Tze-keung (aka "Big Spender"). Li Ka-shing paid a ransom of HK$1 billion, directly to Cheung who had come to his house. A report was never filed with Hong Kong police. Instead the case was pursued by mainland authorities, leading to Cheung's execution in 1998, an outcome not possible under Hong Kong law. Rumours circulated of a deal between Li and the mainland. In interviews, when this rumor was brought up, Li dismissed it completely.

Awards and honours
 Grand Bauhinia Medal
 Knight Commander of the Order of the British Empire 
 Commandeur, Légion d'honneur

Politics
For many years, he was considered to be a top pro-Beijing figure. However, in recent years, tensions have been growing between Li and the mainland, especially with the rise of current China's paramount leader Xi Jinping. During the 2019–20 Hong Kong protests, he refused to outright condemn the protesters, instead urging for peace and calling on the authorities to respond to the protesters humanely.

On 4 August 2011 at the interim results announcement for Hutchison Whampoa, Li endorsed Henry Tang for the forthcoming chief executive election. Then Li said "You all can be just like me, one-person-one-vote." The media then looked at Li in disbelief, and pointed out that regular citizens do not get one-person-one-vote. Li then tried to laugh it off and said "maybe in 2017 they will have one-person-one-vote to choose the chief executive, I probably just said it a little early." Li was, however, criticised by Chinese official state-run press agency Xinhua for being ambiguous in his opposition to the Umbrella movement protests and his support for Leung. Later, prior to the Legco vote, Li said that the largest threat to Hong Kong's future was if the government failed to ensure passage of the 2014–15 round of political reform.

Li's business empire has presence around the world, including China. Li came under attack from Global Times in early 2015, when his companies put out word that it was considering selling prime Shanghai and Beijing properties. It became apparent that Li aimed at re-weighting his asset portfolio to more stable and transparent markets in the West. Concerted attacks ensued and went into a crescendo as China's economy slowed down dramatically in the second half of the year, and the central government sought a way to stem the capital outflows. Specific reproaches were that his asset disposals were "an act of ingratitude" and "immoral at such a sensitive juncture". Security Times, a People's Daily publication, estimated that Li has sold at least 73.8 billion yuan worth of assets since 2014. Li's holding companies denied divesting in China, saying that its asset disposals were being undertaken in the ordinary course of business. The attacks stopped abruptly several weeks later, when editorials in official publications such as People's Daily, Beijing Youth Daily took a neutral stance in unison.

Charities

 The Li Ka Shing Foundation was established in 1980 with a focus on education, medical services and research initiatives. To date, Li Ka-shing has invested over HK$30 billion in projects covering education, medical services, charity and anti-poverty programmes, with about 80% of the projects in mainland China and Hong Kong.
 Li's donation in 1981 resulted in the founding of Shantou University (STU) and the Shantou University Medical College, near his hometown of Chaozhou. Li has earmarked grants and contributions of over HK$12 billion to develop STU. In 2013, Li granted US$130 million to establish the Guangdong Technion – Israel Institute of Technology in Guangdong Province as a joint venture between Technion – Israel Institute of Technology and Shantou University.
 In September 2001, the newest tower in the Hong Kong Polytechnic University was named after Li, following a HK$100 million donation to the University.
 The Li Ka Shing Centre in Cambridge, England, houses a Cancer Research UK facility, which is a part of the University of Cambridge. The Centre was named after Mr. Li following a £5.3 million donation, and was opened in his presence in May 2002. The Li Ka Shing Foundation endowed a professorship of oncology at the university in 2007 with a subsequent gift of £2 million.
 In November 2002, the Cheung Kong Graduate School of Business in China was founded with a large donation from the Li Ka Shing Foundation.
 The Li Ka Shing Library at the Singapore Management University is also named in his honour after a US$11.5 million donation in 2002 to the higher education institution.
 After the 2004 Indian Ocean earthquake disaster, Li reportedly pledged a total of US$3 million.
 In 2005, Li announced a HK$1 billion (US$128 million) donation to the Faculty of Medicine, University of Hong Kong. It was renamed to Li Ka Shing Faculty of Medicine on 1 January 2006, which provoked controversy between the university and quite a number of alumni of the faculty, notably Kwok Ka Ki, over the university's naming procedures.
 Also in 2005, Li donated US$40 million to the University of California, Berkeley, citing that he was impressed with the university's accomplishments in the biosciences. In recognition of Li's donation, the university has named the campus' new biosciences facility the Li Ka Shing Center for Biomedical and Health Sciences, which opened in October 2011.
 In 2014, The Li Ka Shing Foundation provided a US$10 million gift to support UC Berkeley and UC San Francisco to jointly launch the Innovative Genomics Initiative (IGI), based on a new technology discovered at UC Berkeley by Professor Jennifer A. Doudna, executive director of the initiative. In the same year, the Li Ka Shing Foundation has also provided $3 million to Stanford University for exploring new ways of utilising biomedical data to improve human health.
 A long-time supporter of Stanford University since the 1980s, Li is the principal benefactor to the US$90 million Li Ka-shing Center for Learning and Knowledge, which opened in Fall 2010 and is now the headquarters for the Stanford University School of Medicine.
 On 9 March 2007, Li Ka-shing contributed SGD$100 million to the Lee Kuan Yew School of Public Policy in the National University of Singapore. Also, "to honour and recognize Dr. Li's support and generosity, LKY SPP will name one of its three buildings at the historic Bukit Timah Campus after him".
Li Ka-shing donated C$25 million to St. Michael's Hospital in Toronto to found the Li Ka-Shing Knowledge Institute, which will serve as a medical research and education centre in downtown Toronto.
Li Ka-shing donated C$28 million to the University of Alberta to found the Li Ka-shing Institute of Virology.
Li Ka-shing donated HK$160 million (US$20.6 million) to aid relief efforts in the 2008 Sichuan earthquake
Li Ka-shing donated C$6.6 million to McGill University in 2013 to establish three exchange programs: the Li Ka Shing Initiative for Innovation in Legal Education, the Li Ka Shing Liberal Arts Exchange Initiative and the Li Ka Shing Program in International Business between McGill and Shantou University.
In 2013, Li Ka-shing donated US$2 million to the University of California, San Francisco to support their advance precision medicine initiative. The funds will be used to build a worldwide network of clinicians and researchers, launch leadership exchanges between UCSF and China, and create a systems-pharmacology program to develop more precise medications.
With a donation from Li of over HK$3 billion, Tsz Shan Monastery was developed over a period of ten years as an institute of Chinese Buddhist practice and education as well as a place for spiritual contemplation. It was opened to the public in April 2015.
(Hong Kong, 28 April 2015) In the aftermath of the devastating 7.8 magnitude earthquake that struck Nepal and its neighboring regions, the Foundation has made a donation of US$1 million from its Just in Time Fund to provide immediate aid to help ease human suffering and to support ongoing relief efforts in Nepal.
In 2017 Li Ka Shing Foundation  donated US$3 million (A$3.75 million) to the University of Melbourne Centre for Cancer Research (UMCCR) (Australia) for precision oncology. The goal of this donation is to help accelerate the pace of discovery and increase the knowledge used to diagnose and treat cancer.
In 2017, with the support of a £20 million gift from the Li Ka Shing Foundation, Oxford University launched the Big Data Institute. The centre gathers researchers to analyse worldwide biomedical data and catalyze the development of new treatments for cancer, Alzheimer's and several infectious diseases. 
In 2018 Li Ka Shing donated HK$10 million to Food Angel, a program that provides hot meals for people in need.
In 2018 Li Ka Shing Foundation and CK Hutchison Holdings donated US$5 million for Palu-Donggala disaster relief, after Tsunami and Earthquake in Indonesia.
The Foundation funded the world's first circumnavigation of the Antarctic by a robot from January to August 2019. The 23-foot autonomous sailing drone carried instruments of the U.S. National Oceanic and Atmospheric Administration in an effort to enhance climate data collection so as to improve understanding of the Antarctic carbon cycle and as a test for a roll-out of up to 1,000 craft worldwide.

See also
 Hong (business)
 Li's field
 List of Hong Kong people by net worth

Notes

References

External links
 Profile at Cheung Kong Holdings
 200 Inspiring Quotes from Hong Kong Billionaire Li Ka-shing

1928 births
Living people
Billionaires from Guangdong
Businesspeople from Guangdong
Canadian Imperial Bank of Commerce people
 
Commandeurs of the Légion d'honneur
Hong Kong Affairs Advisors
Hong Kong billionaires
Hong Kong Basic Law Drafting Committee members
Hong Kong Buddhists
Hong Kong chairpersons of corporations
Hong Kong emigrants to Canada
Hong Kong businesspeople
Hong Kong financial businesspeople
Hong Kong hoteliers
Hong Kong information technology businesspeople
Hong Kong investors
Hong Kong philanthropists
Hong Kong real estate businesspeople
Hong Kong shipping businesspeople
Hong Kong telecommunications industry businesspeople
HSBC people
Knights Commander of the Order of the British Empire
Members of the Selection Committee of Hong Kong
Members of the Election Committee of Hong Kong, 1998–2000
Members of the Election Committee of Hong Kong, 2000–2005
Members of the Election Committee of Hong Kong, 2007–2012
Members of the Election Committee of Hong Kong, 2012–2017
Members of the Election Committee of Hong Kong, 2017–2021
Members of the Preparatory Committee for the Hong Kong Special Administrative Region
People from Chaozhou
Real estate company founders
Recipients of the Grand Bauhinia Medal
People with multiple nationality